The 1986 French Open was a tennis tournament that took place on the outdoor clay courts at the Stade Roland Garros in Paris, France. The tournament was held from 26 May until 8 June. It was the 90th staging of the French Open, and the first Grand Slam tennis event of 1986.

The event was part of the 1986 Nabisco Grand Prix and 1986 Virginia Slims World Championship Series.

Finals

Men's singles

 Ivan Lendl defeated  Mikael Pernfors, 6–3, 6–2, 6–4 
It was Lendl's 6th title of the year, and his 59th overall. It was his 3rd career Grand Slam title, and his 2nd French Open title.

Women's singles

 Chris Evert defeated  Martina Navratilova, 2–6, 6–3, 6–3.
It was Evert's 18th (and last) career Grand Slam title, and her 7th French Open singles title (a record).

Men's doubles

 John Fitzgerald /  Tomáš Šmíd defeated  Stefan Edberg /  Anders Järryd, 6–3, 4–6, 6–3, 6–7(4–7), 14–12

Women's doubles

 Martina Navratilova /  Andrea Temesvári defeated  Steffi Graf /  Gabriela Sabatini, 6–1, 6–2

Mixed doubles

 Kathy Jordan /  Ken Flach defeated  Rosalyn Fairbank /  Mark Edmondson, 3–6, 7–6(7–3), 6–3

Prize money

Total prize money for the event was FF21,528,000.

References

External links
 French Open official website